Richard Solomon may refer to:

 Richard Solomon (psychologist) (1918–1995), American psychologist
 Richard Solomon (barrister) (1850–1913), British member of Parliament and Attorney General of the Cape Colony and of the Transvaal
 Richard Solomon (basketball) (born 1992), American basketball player
 Richard H. Solomon (1937–2017), United States Assistant Secretary of State and Ambassador to the Philippines

See also 
 Richard Solomons (born 1961), British businessman